The Capitol Years may refer to:
 The Capitol Years (1990 Frank Sinatra album), a 1990 three-disc compilation album by Frank Sinatra
 The Capitol Years (1998 Frank Sinatra album), a 1998 21-disc box set by Frank Sinatra
 The Capitol Years (Kingston Trio album), a 1995 album by The Kingston Trio
 The Capitol Years (The Beach Boys album), a 1980 album by The Beach Boys
 The Capitol Years 65/77, a 1998 album by Glen Campbell 
 Capitol Years, an American band